Otto Huber (March 12, 1914 – April 9, 1989) was a Major League Baseball player. He played one season with the Boston Bees from June 10 to July 20, 1939.

References

External links

1914 births
1989 deaths
Baseball players from New Jersey
Boston Bees players
Evansville Bees players
Greensburg Red Wings players
Hartford Bees players
Indianapolis Indians players
Major League Baseball second basemen
Major League Baseball third basemen
Minot Mallards players
Mount Vernon Kings players
People from Garfield, New Jersey
Sportspeople from Bergen County, New Jersey
Zanesville Greys players